Ian "Powerhouse" Jacobs is an Australian kickboxer and former 3 time World Kickboxing Champion.

He has had victories over other former World Champions, such as Gurkan Ozkan by Unanimous points decision, and 'Diamond' Dale Westerman by Knockout.

Ian Jacobs made a comeback to Kickboxing in November 2009, at Tarik Solak's A-1 8 man eliminator tournament.
In his 1st match, Ian set a new world record for the fastest KO in kickboxing history, breaking a record held for 17 years by Stan Longinidis, as Ian Jacobs knocked out The Headhunter in 6 seconds.
However, Ian Jacobs then lost to Baris Nezif in the Semi-final via Knockout.
Ian's only other 2 losses came from earlier in his career against Manson Gibson and Alex Tui.

Titles and accomplishments

WKA World Middleweight Kickboxing Title
WKA World Middleweight Muay Thai Title
ISKA World Super Middleweight Muay Thai Title
2 x Commonwealth Super Middleweight Title
Commonwealth Middleweight Title
Australia Middleweight Title
Australia Super Light Heavyweight Title
Queensland Super Middleweight Title
Queensland Light Heavyweight Title
National hardest hitting champion in both light & heavy weight divisions
Best ever kick Knock Out award
Inducted into the Kickboxing Hall of fame
Best fight ever seen on FOX Sports
Three-time winner of the open "National Martial Arts League". Hardest punch, hardest kick and hardest punch/ kick combination. Winner of both lightweight and heavyweight divisions.

References

Year of birth missing (living people)
Australian male kickboxers
Middleweight kickboxers
Light heavyweight kickboxers
Sportsmen from Queensland
Living people
Kickboxers from Brisbane